"Vi är på gång" is a song written by Tomas Ledin, originally appearing as a B-side for the single "Det finns inget finare än kärleken", released in May 1983. The song later became common at sporting events in Sweden.

A later version, Vi är på gång - VM 2006, was appointed fight song of Team Sweden for the 2006 FIFA World Cup in Germany.

Tomas Ledin has also recorded the song in English, as "We're on the Beat".

2006 single
Released on 17 May 2006, and produced by Jörgen Ingeström and Bo Reimer, the 2006 single version peaked at 5th position at the Swedish singles chart. The song received a Svensktoppen test on 11 June 2006, but failed to enter chart.

Single
"Vi är på gång - VM 2006" – 3:10 
"Vi är på gång - VM 2006" (arena version) – 3:45

Chart positions

References

 

1983 songs
2006 singles
Fight songs
Songs written by Tomas Ledin
Swedish-language songs
Tomas Ledin songs